Patrice Hagelauer (born 5 January 1948) is a French tennis coach and former professional player. He competed on the professional tennis circuit in the 1970s, before going into coaching.

Biography
Born and raised in French Morocco, Hagelauer moved with his parents to mainland France around the age of 16.

Hagelauer featured in the main draws of the Australian Open and French Open during his career, as well as in Wimbledon qualifiers. His best performance came at the 1976 Australian Open, where he upset sixth seed Geoff Masters, en route to the third round.

Coaching
As a coach he spent many years heading the France Davis Cup team and formed a successful association with Yannick Noah. Under the coaching of Hagelauer, Noah became the first Frenchman in 37 years to win at Roland Garros when he claimed the 1983 French Open title. Hagelauer's tenure as Davis Cup coach included the drought breaking tournament win in 1991, which was the country's first triumph since 1932. This team was captained by Noah.

From 1999 to 2002 he was the performance director of Britain's Lawn Tennis Association.

Grand Prix career finals

Doubles: 1 (0–1)

References

External links
 
 

1948 births
Living people
French male tennis players
French tennis coaches
Moroccan emigrants to France
Sportspeople from Marrakesh